The Radio Navigational Aids (Publication 117) publication contains a detailed list of selected worldwide radio stations that provide services to the mariner. The publication is divided into chapters according to the nature of the service provided by the radio stations. The services include Radio direction finder and Radar Stations; stations broadcasting navigational warnings, time signals or medical advice; communication traffic for distress, emergency and safety including the Global Maritime Distress Safety System (GMDSS) and long range navigational aids. It also contains chapters describing procedures of the AMVER System, and the interim emergency procedures and communication instructions to be followed by U.S merchant vessels in times of crisis. A new edition of Publication 117 is published annually. This publication is available in its entirety on the website and there are also database queries available for much of the data contained within.

See also

American Practical Navigator
Buoy
Coast Pilots
Light List
List of Lights
Local Notice to Mariners
Notice to Mariners
Sailing Directions
Radio navigation

References

Works cited

External links
 Chapter 4: Nautical Publications - from the online edition of Nathaniel Bowditch's American Practical Navigator
 List of Radio Signals available online (Nautical Free)

Navigation
Hydrography
Sailing books